This is a summary of 1945 in music in the United Kingdom.

Events
7 June – First performance of Peter Grimes in Sadler's Wells, London.
29 June – William Walton opposes a proposal that the British Council should support a complete recording of Peter Grimes, suggesting that this should be discussed "at a calmer moment when the wildly hysterical & uncritical eulogies & general 'ballyhoo' have somewhat abated, & the true merits of the work can be properly assessed."
 July – Benjamin Britten and Yehudi Menuhin tour Germany to perform concerts in liberated concentration camps, including Belsen.
26 July – Composer Ernest John Moeran marries cellist Peers Coetmore.
Unknown date – Walter Legge founds the Philharmonia Orchestra.

Popular music
Noël Coward – "Matelot", "Nina (from Argentina)", from Coward's musical Sigh No More
Dorothy Squires – "The Gypsy" (Billy Reid)

Classical music: new works
Benjamin Britten – The Young Person's Guide to the Orchestra
Pamela Harrison – String Trio
Michael Tippett – Symphony No. 1
William Walton – Memorial Fanfare for Henry Wood

Opera
Benjamin Britten – Peter Grimes

Film and Incidental music
Richard Addinsell – Blithe Spirit
Ralph Vaughan Williams – The Story of a Flemish Farm

Musical theatre
21 April – Perchance To Dream (Music, Lyrics and Book: Ivor Novello) – London production opens at the London Hippodrome and runs for 1022 performances.
28 August – Noël Coward's revue Sigh No More opens at the Piccadilly Theatre.

Musical films
Flight from Folly, directed by Herbert Mason, starring Patricia Kirkwood and Hugh Sinclair.  The Daily Mirror described the film as a "neatly made and tuneful comedy" with praise for Kirkwood's "vivacious personality and talent". 
Home Sweet Home, directed by John E. Blakeley, starring Frank Randle, with music by Percival Mackey.
I'll Be Your Sweetheart – directed by Val Guest, starring Margaret Lockwood, Vic Oliver and Michael Rennie.
Waltz Time, directed by Paul L. Stein, starring Carol Raye, Peter Graves and Patricia Medina, with music by Hans May.

Births
10 January – Rod Stewart, singer and songwriter
19 January – Trevor Williams, English singer-songwriter and bass player (Audience and The Nashville Teens)
25 January – Dave Walker, English singer and guitarist (Savoy Brown and Fleetwood Mac)
26 January – Jacqueline du Pré, cellist (died 1987)
30 March – Eric Clapton, guitarist, singer and songwriter
25 February – Elkie Brooks, singer
14 April – Ritchie Blackmore, guitarist
19 May – Pete Townshend (The Who)
29 May – Gary Brooker (Procol Harum)
24 June – Colin Blunstone, singer
25 June – Labi Siffre, singer-songwriter
28 June – David Knights, bass player and producer (Procol Harum)
19 August – Ian Gillan, singer
5 September – Al Stewart, singer-songwriter
7 September – Max Boyce, singer-songwriter
8 September – Kelly Groucutt, British bassist (died 2009)
24 September – John Rutter, composer
26 September – Bryan Ferry, singer and songwriter
5 October – Brian Connolly, vocalist (Sweet) (died 1997)
28 October 
Elton Dean, saxophonist and keyboard player (died 2006)
Wayne Fontana, singer  (died 2020)
30 November – Stan Sulzmann, saxophonist and educator
3 December – Paul Nicholas, actor and singer
24 December – Lemmy, singer and bassist (Motörhead, Hawkwind) (died 2015) 
30 December – Davy Jones, singer and actor (died 2012)

Deaths
8 February – James Campbell McInnes, baritone singer and teacher, 71
12 April – Maurice Besly, organist, composer and conductor, 57
24 April – Hubert Bath, film composer, 61
15 May – Kenneth J. Alford, composer of military marches, 64
21 May – Hugh Enes Blackmore, singer and actor, 81
15 August – Frederic Lord, organist, conductor and composer, 58
19 November – Helen Hopekirk, pianist and composer, 89
15 December – Tobias Matthay, pianist and composer, 87

See also
 1945 in British television
 1945 in the United Kingdom
 List of British films of 1945

References

 
British Music, 1946 In
British music by year
1940s in British music